The National Directorate of Security (NDS;) was the national intelligence and security service of Afghanistan. The headquarters of the NDS was in Kabul, and it had field offices and training facilities in all 34 provinces of Afghanistan. The NDS was part of the Afghan National Security Forces (ANSF).

The NDS was mandated to investigate cases and incidents that affect Afghan national security and to fight terrorism. According to the Law on Crimes against Internal and External Security of the Democratic Republic of Afghanistan, the agency is tasked to investigate cases involving "national treason, espionage, terrorism, sabotage, propaganda against the Government, war propaganda, assisting enemy forces, and organised activity against internal and external security".

As the primary intelligence organ of Afghanistan, the NDS shared information about regional terrorism and major crimes with the Afghan ministries and provincial governors. Its activities were regulated according to the National Security Law.

History

The National Directorate of Security was founded as the primary domestic and foreign intelligence agency of the Islamic Republic of Afghanistan in 2002, and is considered the successor to KHAD, which was the previous intelligence organization before the Afghan Civil War (1992–2001). The CIA was responsible for assisting the Afghan government to establish the NDS.

On January 16, 2013, the Taliban targeted the NDS compound in Kabul in a suicide bombing, followed by small arms fire. In 2016, the NDS compound in Kabul was targeted in a bombing attack at the city's Puli Mahmood Khan neighborhood. The Taliban claimed responsibility for the attack.

On February 18, 2018, the NDS suffered a rare attack from Taliban sympathizers when four double agents attacked a NDS facility in Gerishk District.

After the fall of Kabul to Taliban fighters, many NDS agents and other personnel chose to leave and head to India, Tajikistan and Uzbekistan in order to hide. The NDS' 01 unit reportedly made a deal with the United States to assist with security at Hamid Karzai International Airport in exchange for being airlifted out of Afghanistan.

As of August 20, 2021, the NDS' last director Ahmad Saraj is reportedly hiding from the Taliban in London.

On October 26, 2021, the Taliban announced the establishment of the General Directorate of Intelligence (GDI). This replaced the NDS.

On January 7, 2022, female NDS agents reported that they're in danger of being targeted by the Taliban a year after the Taliban regained control of Afghanistan. On December 3, 2022, it was reported that ex-NDS agents were being secretly recruited to assist in Russia's fight in Ukraine.

Controversies
On July 9, 2011, an off-duty NDS agent in Panjshir opened fire and shot a contractor and a NATO soldier.

Organization
The NDS was part of the Afghan National Security Forces (ANSF) and reported directly to the Office of the President.

NDS-related facilities were found all over Afghanistan, including in Herat, Kabul, Kandahar, Khost and Laghman.

The agency was divided into departments and units that were known by numbers.

 Number 018 - Internal Security (Formerly Number 034 as of 2011)
 Number 040 - Investigations (Formerly Number 017 as of 2011)
 Number 124 - Counter-Terrorism (Formerly Number 090 as of 2011)
 Special Forces Unit - Divided to four regional operational areas. They're known to have close working relationships with the CIA.
 Sangorian - The NDS commands the militia after it was raised in 2016. They were involved in the 2021 Taliban offensive.

SF Area of Responsibility

Operations

After the ouster of the Taliban in 2002, the NDS warned ISI about exiled militant commanders and al-Qaeda operatives hiding in Pakistan. In early 2006, intelligence gathered from NDS detainees suggested Osama bin Laden resided in the western Pakistan town of Mansehra. A classified NDS paper completed in May, titled "Strategy of the Taliban," claimed ISI and Saudi Arabia restarted active support for the Taliban in 2005. Pakistan's military leadership sought to weaken and delegitimize Hamid Karzai's government, in order to prevent an alliance between Afghanistan and India.

In 2007, Amrullah Saleh's NDS used arrests and interrogations to discover the majority of suicide bombings in Afghanistan originated among Pashtuns from Pakistan's Federally Administered Tribal Areas.

During the April 2014 Afghan Presidential Election, the NDS, under Rahmatullah Nabil, collected thousands of signals intelligence indicating Ashraf Ghani's allies organized massive electoral fraud.

The NDS has had a degree of success, including capturing Maulvi Faizullah, a notable Taliban leader, and foiling an assassination attempt against Abdul Rashid Dostum in 2014.

The NDS captured Aslam Farooqi, the chief of ISIS-K, on April 4, 2020. On December 4, 2020, the NDS busted a 10-man cell consisting of Chinese nationals linked to the Ministry of State Security, who were subsequently arrested for trying to build up connections to the Haqqani Network. India's Research and Analysis Wing had provided tips to the NDS, which led to the arrest.

Directors and deputy heads
 Muhammad Arif Sarwari (Oct. 2001 – Feb. 2004)
 Amrullah Saleh (Feb. 2004 – June 2010)
 Ibrahim Spinzada (June 2010 – July 2010) Acting
 Rahmatullah Nabil (July 2010 – September 2012), Hasamudin Hasam (deputy 2011) 
 Asadullah Khalid (September 2012 – August 2013)
 Rahmatullah Nabil (August 2013 – December 2015)
 Mohammed Masoom Stanekzai (May 2016 – September 2019)
 Ahmad Zia Saraj (September 2019 – August 2021)

Criticisms
In 2015, the NDS was criticized for allowing its special forces personnel to act as bodyguards for some Afghan politicians, but NDS officials justified their role as a security precaution.

In 2018, the agency was criticized for deploying inexperienced officers tasked to collect intelligence related to national security matters. This was a product of massive failures to cooperate with the other parts of the government.

It has been accused in the past of conducting human rights violations towards detainees, including young children.

During the airlift operations in Kabul after the capital was captured by the Taliban, NDS 01 operators were accused of harassing Afghans of Hazara origin.

Notes

References

Further reading 
Julian Richards – A Guide to National Security: Threats, Responses and Strategies published by OUP Oxford, 23 Feb 2012, 
Jared N. Gehmann (Sgt.) – focus – published by Afghanistan Resolute Support (Nato)
Sylvana Q. Sinha (of the Weil's International Arbitration and Trade Practice Group – World Justice Project) – prison visit to view NDS detainees December 10, 2012
Independent Strategy and Intelligence Study Group – report June 2, 2015:The NDS disrupt a plot

External links

 

Law enforcement in the Islamic Republic of Afghanistan
2001 establishments in Afghanistan
Defunct Afghan intelligence agencies
Government agencies established in 2002
Defunct law enforcement agencies of Afghanistan